Tristan Eysele (born 21 November 1989) is a South African male squash player. He achieved his highest career ranking of 126 in March 2018 which is also his current ranking which he achieved during the 2018 PSA World Tour.

He is coached by both former South African professional squash player, Jesse Engelbrecht and English professional squash player, Robbie Temple.

References 

1989 births
Living people
South African male squash players
Sportspeople from Pietermaritzburg
21st-century South African people